The Henry T. and Rebecca Reynolds House  is a historic residence within the Springville Historic District in Springville, Utah, United States, that is listed on the National Register of Historic Places (NRHP).

Description
The house is located at 270 West 200 South and was built in 1875. It includes Greek Revival architecture. It was listed on the National Register of Historic Places in 1998.

It was listed on the NRHP January 5, 1998.

See also

 National Register of Historic Places listings in Utah County, Utah

References

External links

Greek Revival houses in Utah
Houses completed in 1875
Houses in Utah County, Utah
Houses on the National Register of Historic Places in Utah
National Register of Historic Places in Utah County, Utah
Buildings and structures in Springville, Utah
Individually listed contributing properties to historic districts on the National Register in Utah